The 1999 Sensational Adelaide 500 was the first running of the Adelaide 500 race, the first motor racing meeting held on the Adelaide Street Circuit since the 1995 Australian Grand Prix. Racing at the Mount Panorama Circuit notwithstanding, it was the first domestic racing meeting held on public roads since the closure of the Longford Circuit in Tasmania in the 1960s.

Format 
Racing was held from Friday 9 April until Sunday 11 April 1999. The race was held for V8 Supercars and was Round 2 of the 1999 Shell Championship Series. The format, unique to V8 Supercar and loosely similar to the Pukekohe 500 format, consisted of two 250 km races.

The original format called for the two races to form a single race, separated by an overnight rest at half distance, however with several significant competitors retiring from the first leg a change to the regulations was announced on the Saturday evening, allowing retired cars to be repaired and restarted for Sunday's Leg 2.

Official results

Top ten shootout
Results sourced from:

Leg 1
Results sourced from:

Leg 2
Results sourced from:

Round results

References

Statistics
 Provisional Position - #5 Glenn Seton - 1:25.0825
 Pole Position - #4 Jason Bright - 1:25.2366
 Fastest Lap - #4 Jason Bright - 1:26.2491 (lap record)

External links
 Official race results
 Official V8 Supercar website

Adelaide 500
Sensational Adelaide 500
April 1999 sports events in Australia
1990s in Adelaide